BT Sport Box Office is a pay-per-view channel from BT Sport. The channel is available in HD on BT TV and Sky.

History 
In April 2018, BT Sport revealed its intention to launch a pay-per-view channel to show live boxing and it launched on 15 September 2018 when it showed the rematch between Gennady Golovkin and Saul Alvarez. Further boxing events, including both Tyson Fury bouts versus Deontay Wilder, along with Fury versus Wallin and Schwarz, in addition to Amir Khan v Terrence Crawford, have also been shown on BT Sport Box Office.

Since UFC 239, selected UFC pay-per-view events have been carried on Box Office, including UFC 242, UFC 246, UFC 254, UFC 257 and UFC 264

From January 2020, WWE pay-per-views are sold via BT Sport Box Office.

Amazon Premier League Pass
In November 2019 to early January 2020, BT Sport Box Office 2 was launched on Sky in the UK and Ireland on channel 494. BT Sport Box Office on channel 490 was temporarily removed from residential set-top boxes to facilitate the 2019–20 Premier League being broadcast to licensed premises only. On the EPG, BT Sport Box Office was renamed Amazon Premier League Pass during this time. These channels were provided by Amazon. 6 channels were broadcast via the red button on selected dates. It is assumed that BT Sport Box Office 2 was launched so Sky would suffice their contract with BT. It returned in July 2020 for the final month of the premier league 2019–20 season.

Premier League
In October 2020, amidst the COVID-19 pandemic forbidding spectators to attend football matches, select Premier League matches were allowed to be broadcast on a PPV basis which would have typically been affected by the Saturday 3pm blackout. The first game available to the general public on the channel was Chelsea versus Southampton on 17 October.

See also
Sky Box Office
ITV Box Office

References

External links
 

BT Sport
Sports television in the United Kingdom
Sports television channels in the United Kingdom
Pay-per-view television channels in the United Kingdom
Television channels and stations established in 2018